John Benjamin Gillon III (born March 31, 1994) is an American professional basketball player. He played in college for Little Rock, Colorado State, and Syracuse.

College career
Gillon started his collegiate career at Arkansas-Little Rock, where he averaged 10.6 points in his freshman season. Afterwards, he decided to transfer to Colorado State where, under NCAA transfer rules, he would redshirt during his first year there. During his redshirt sophomore year he would only start one game for Colorado State, and averaged 7.9 points. The following season that number would improve to 13.2 points per game, and he also shot 88% from the free throw line.

After graduating from Colorado State, with one more year of remaining college eligibility Gillon decided to transfer again to Syracuse.  His scoring numbers took a dip, averaging 10.5 per game, however he led the team in assists per game with 5.4, which was also his career-best. He also ended up setting the school record for most consecutive free throws made, with 48. That also tied for the third most consecutive free throws made in ACC history. On February 22, 2017, during a game in the Carrier Dome against Duke, Gillon made a last second three pointer to win the game, with a final score of 75–78.

Professional career

2017–18 season
After going undrafted in the 2017 NBA draft, Gillon was taken by the Texas Legends in the annual NBA G-League Draft, where he would play five games and average 3.6 points per game before getting waived on November 28. On December 3, Gillon was picked up by the Erie BayHawks, reuniting with former Syracuse teammate, Andrew White. Gillon had 40 points in a win against the Fort Wayne Mad Ants on March 24, 2018.

2018–19 season
Gillon was added to the training camp roster of the Erie BayHawks in October 2018. On February 21, 2019 he was traded to the Greensboro Swarm for Cat Barber.

2019–20 season
On September 6, 2019, Gillon signed with Pieno žvaigždės Pasvalys of the Lithuanian Basketball League. He averaged 13.1 points, 4.4 assists, and 2.2 rebounds per game.

2020–21 season
On July 5, 2020, he has signed with Darüşşafaka Tekfen of the Turkish Basketbol Süper Ligi.

On February 18, 2021, he has signed with Alba Fehérvár of the NB I/A.

2021–22 season
On November 9, 2021, Gillon has signed with Taoyuan Pilots of the P. League+.

On January 7, 2022, Gillon has signed with Taoyuan Leopards of the T1 League.

The Basketball Tournament
John Gillon played for Boeheim's Army in the 2018 edition of The Basketball Tournament. In 4 games, he averaged 14.5 points, 3.5 assists, and 1.8 rebounds per game. Boeheim's Army reached the Northeast Regional Championship before falling to the Golden Eagles.

References

External links
Syracuse Orange bio

1994 births
Living people
American men's basketball players
Basketball players from Houston
BC Pieno žvaigždės players
Colorado State Rams men's basketball players
Darüşşafaka Basketbol players
Erie BayHawks (2017–2019) players
Greensboro Swarm players
Little Rock Trojans men's basketball players
Point guards
Syracuse Orange men's basketball players
Texas Legends players
American expatriate basketball people in Taiwan
Taoyuan Pilots players
Taoyuan Leopards players
T1 League imports
P. League+ imports